James Henderson Imlay (November 26, 1764 – March 6, 1823) was a United States Representative from New Jersey. He served two terms from 1797 to 1801.

Early life, education and career
Born in Imlaystown, he pursued classical studies and graduated from Princeton College in 1786, where he was also a tutor. He studied law, was admitted to the bar in 1791, and practiced.

He was a major in the Monmouth County Militia and served in the Revolutionary War. He was a counselor in 1796, and was a member of the New Jersey General Assembly from 1793 to 1796, serving as speaker in the latter year.

Tenure in Congress
Imlay was elected as a Federalist to the Fifth and Sixth Congresses, serving from March 4, 1797 to March 3, 1801. While in the House, he was one of the managers appointed by the House of Representatives in 1798 to conduct the impeachment proceedings against U.S. Senator William Blount of Tennessee.

Later career and death
In 1804 and 1805, Imlay was postmaster of Allentown, New Jersey, and resumed the practice of law there; he died in Allentown in 1823. Interment was in the Presbyterian Church Cemetery.

References

1764 births
1823 deaths
People from Allentown, New Jersey
Politicians from Monmouth County, New Jersey
Princeton University alumni
Speakers of the New Jersey General Assembly
Members of the New Jersey General Assembly
New Jersey postmasters
Burials in New Jersey
People of New Jersey in the American Revolution
New Jersey militiamen in the American Revolution
People of colonial New Jersey
Federalist Party members of the United States House of Representatives from New Jersey